Asterivora exocha is a species of moth in the family Choreutidae. It was first described by Edward Meyrick in 1907 and is endemic to New Zealand. This species has only been observed in the Humboldt Ranges of Otago and inhabits subalpine native bush at elevations of around 3600 ft. Adults of this species are on the wing in December and January and have been observed flying at dusk.

Taxonomy 
This species was first described by Edward Meyrick in 1907, using a specimen collected by George Hudson at the Humboldt Range, Lake Wakatipu  at 3,600 ft, and named Simaethis exocha. In 1928 George Hudson discussed and illustrated this species under that name in his book The butterflies and moths of New Zealand. In 1979 J. S. Dugdale placed this species within the genus Asterivora. In 1988 Dugdale confirmed this placement. The male holotype specimen, collected in the Humboldt Mountains, is held at the Natural History Museum, London.

Description 

Meyrick described this species as follows:

Distribution

This species is endemic to New Zealand and has been observed in the Humboldt Range near Lake Wakatipu.

Habitat 
This species inhabits subalpine bush containing Hebe species at elevations of approximately 3600 ft.

Host 

The larval host of this species is Brachyglottis cassinioides.

Behaviour 
Adults of this species are on the wing in December and January. They have been observed to fly at dusk.

References

Asterivora
Moths of New Zealand
Endemic fauna of New Zealand
Moths described in 1907
Taxa named by Edward Meyrick
Endemic moths of New Zealand